The CECAFA Cup, is the oldest football tournament in Africa. It is organized by the Council for East and Central Africa Football Associations (CECAFA).  A FIFA competition, it includes participants of football playing national teams from the East African Region.

Cup history

There is an anomaly on national teams in the case of Tanzania.  It fields two teams, Tanzania and Zanzibar. In 2005 and 2006, the tournament was sponsored by the Ethiopian-Saudi businessman Sheikh Mohammed Al Amoudi, and was dubbed the Al Amoudi Senior Challenge Cup. It is the successor competition of the Gossage Cup, held 37 times from 1926 until 1966, and the East and Central African Senior Challenge Cup, held 7 times between 1965 and 1971.

In August 2012, CECAFA signed a sponsorship deal worth US$450,000 with East African Breweries to have the cup renamed to the CECAFA Tusker Challenge Cup.

Previous winners

Gossage Cup (1926–1966) and Challenge Cup (1967–1971)
The Gossage Cup and Challenge Cup was contested between Kenya, Uganda, Tanganyika and Zanzibar (Only in 1953 Ruanda-Urundi was competed too). The first match was played between the Kenyan and Ugandan national teams in May 1926, with Kenya winning 2–1 in a replay. Tanganyika participated since 1945 and Zanzibar since 1949. The tournament was sponsored by the soap manufacturer Gossage, owned by the British Lever Brothers. In 1967, the competition was renamed to the East and Central African Senior Challenge Cup.

CECAFA Cup
With the formation of CECAFA in 1973, the tournament was renamed to the CECAFA Cup. Since 2021, the tournament had been renamed to the CECAFA U-23 Challenge Cup.

§  The 2014 CECAFA Cup would have been the 38th edition of the Cup. It was scheduled to take place in Ethiopia from 24 November to 9 December, but the nation withdrew from hosting the tournament in October due to "domestic and international engagements", according to CECAFA secretary-general Nicholas Musonye.  Musonye also announced that Sudan as one of the countries that could have replaced Ethiopia as the hosts of the tournament.  After none of the 12 member nations of CECAFA expressed an interest in hosting the tournament on short notice, it was announced on 27 November that CECAFA had cancelled the competition.  Rwanda hosted the 2015 edition of the competition.
≠ The 2016 CECAFA Cup was to be the 39th edition of the annual CECAFA Cup.  In September 2016, it was confirmed that Kenya would host the tournament. Originally, it was slated to be hosted in Sudan.  In November 2016, Kenya announced they are not ready to host the tournament and CECAFA officials are looking to persuade Sudan to take over as hosts.  In December 2016, CECAFA announced the 2016 edition of the tournament will be canceled.

Notes
 1  – From 1945 to 1955 and 1973 to 1976 there was no third place play-off and both teams eliminated in the semi-finals were acknowledged as the third-placed team.
 2  – In 1971 2nd place shared between Uganda and Tanzania.

 A  – Score was 1–1 after 90 minutes. Tanzania won the shoot-out 5–3.
 B  – Score was 0–0 after 90 minutes. Kenya won the shoot-out 4–3.
 C  – Score was 0–0 after 90 minutes. Uganda won the shoot-out 5–3.
 D  – Score was 1–1 after 90 minutes. Kenya won the shoot-out 4–3.
 E  – Score was 0–0 after 90 minutes. Zambia won the shoot-out 3–0.
 F  – Score was 1–1 after 90 minutes. Ethiopia won the shoot-out 5–4.
 G  – Score was 0–0 after 90 minutes. Kenya won the shoot-out 3–2.
 H  – Score was 3–3 after 90 minutes. Uganda won the shoot-out 2–1.
 I  – Score was 2–2 after 90 minutes. Tanzania won the shoot-out 4–3.
 K  – Score was 1–1 after 90 minutes. Sudan won the shoot-out 5–4.
 L  – Score was 0–0 after 90 minutes. Rwanda won the shoot-out 3–2.
 M  – Score was 1–1 after 90 minutes. Ethiopia won the shoot-out 5–3.
 N  – Score was 0–0 after 90 minutes. Zanzibar won the shoot-out 5–4.
 O  – Score was 0–0 after 90 minutes. Zambia won the shoot-out 11–10, but Sudan were given the title as Zambia were invited as guests.
 P  – Score was 0–0 after 90 minutes. Rwanda won the shoot-out 4–2.
 Q  – Score was 2–2 after 90 minutes. Sudan won the shoot-out 4–2.
 R  – Score was 2–2 after 90 minutes. Uganda won the shoot-out 3–2.
 S  – Score was 1–1 after 90 minutes. Zanzibar won the shoot-out 6–5.
 T  – Score was 1–1 after 90 minutes. Zanzibar won the shoot-out 6–5.
 U  – Score was 1–1 after 90 minutes. Ethiopia won the shoot-out 4–3.
 V  – Score was 2–2 after 120 minutes. Kenya won the shoot-out 3–2.
 W  – Score was 0–0 after 120 minutes. Tanzania won the shoot-out 6–5.

General statistics

FIFA A-level matches (A-level match rule). FIFA (B teams results, Ruanda-Urundi results, Rwanda results before 1978, Burundi results before 1972, All of Zanzibar results, Kenya results before 1960, Uganda results before 1960 and Tanzania results before 1964) are not counted as A-level match (All of them are unofficial before membership in FIFA). But this table consist of all matches.

1926–1966

1967–1971

1973–2019

Medals (1926–2017)

Notes: 
 From 1926 to 1944 there was no 3rd place because of only 2 teams.
 From 1947 to 1955 there was no 3rd place match and 3rd place shared.
 1957 and 1959 third place shared.
 From 1973 to 1976 there was no 3rd place match and 3rd place shared.
 1960 1st place shared.
 1971 2nd place shared.

See also
 CECAFA U-20 Championship
 CECAFA U-17 Championship
 CECAFA Women's Championship
 CECAFA U-20 Women's Championship
 CECAFA Club Cup
 CECAFA Nile Basin Cup

References

Sources
RSSSF - East and Central African Championship (CECAFA)

External links
  of CECAFA
 CECAFA Cup group on Facebook

 
CECAFA competitions
International association football competitions in Africa
Recurring sporting events established in 1973